JTRE (J&T Real Estate) is a European real estate developer based in Bratislava, Slovakia.  The firm has completed over 50 projects in 9 countries with a combined value of approximately €1.6 billion, and it is active in many market segments—including mixed-use, office, residential, hospitality, logistics, retail, and industrial projects.

JTRE was founded in 1996 as part of the central European investment group J&T. The company is controlled by holding company J&T Real Estate Holding Limited, which is owned by founder Peter Korbačka and other management. JTRE has offices in London, Prague and Bratislava.

The company is a seven-time Developer of the Year in Slovakia, as awarded by the ASB Magazine, and its projects have been awarded Building of the Year by the Construction & Investment Journal. Since 2012, it has been a member of the Slovak Green Building Council.

History 

JTRE (J&T Real Estate) was founded in 1996 in Bratislava, Slovakia as J&T Global by Slovak businessman Peter Korbačka as part of the J&T Finance Group. The first project was Mestské vily Machnáč, a residential development on the Bratislava Castle hill in Slovakia. The first office development was the reconstruction of Westend Tower in the Patrónka neighborhood of Bratislava, Slovakia.

Over time, JTRE acquired numerous high-profile land lots in Bratislava and Prague and the company graduated into developing whole city neighborhoods, such as the new downtown of Bratislava branded as Eurovea City. In 2006 the company changed its name to the current J&T Real Estate and two years later JTRE Holding was established dividing from J&T Finance Group. It diversified its portfolio with hotel property development in Moscow (Hotel Baltschug Kempinski Moscow), Bratislava (Grand Hotel River Park) and the High Tatra mountains (Grand Hotel Kempinski High Tatras) as well as branching out into industrial halls development and retail space development (Eperia Shopping Mall in Prešov).

Since 2017 J&T Real Estate is the general sponsor of the White Night art festival in Slovakia.

In 2018 the company entered the UK real estate market by acquiring a project in the South Bank neighborhood of London. The project is being developed as Triptych Bankside due to be completed in 2022. In 2019 J&T Real Estate acquired the London-based real estate developer Sons & Co London Limited and transformed it into JTRE London Limited. As of 2019 J&T Real Estate had developed 1 million sqm of property valued at over €1.6 billion.

Operations 
The company's operations are divided into five business segments:
 Real estate development
 Property management
 Facility management
 Real estate private equity
 Investment

Portfolio 
Notable properties developed by J&T Real Estate include River Park, Zuckermandel, Panorama Towers, Landererova 12, Pribinova 19, Rustonka, Westend, Karloveske rameno, Fuxova, Grand Hotel Kempinski High Tatras, Baltschug Kempinski Moscow and Eperia Shopping Mall.

Notable J&T Real Estate properties under construction include: Triptych Bankside in London, Eurovea extension with the very first Slovak skyscraper Eurovea Tower, Klingerka and Ovocne sady in Bratislava and Eperia Shopping Mall extension in Prešov.

Corporate governance 
Pavel Pelikán is the Executive Director of JTRE. Juraj Marko is the Managing Director of JTRE London. J&T Real Estate Holding Limited board of directors consists of: Peter Korbačka (chairman), Michal Borguľa, Miroslav Fülöp, Pavel Pelikán, Peter Remenár and Juraj Kalman.

See also 
 Economy of Slovakia
 JTRE London
 J&T

References

External links 

Companies of Slovakia
Companies based in Bratislava
Real estate companies of Slovakia
Real estate companies established in 1996
1996 establishments in Slovakia